Eastern Scottish Omnibuses Ltd. was a bus and coach operator based in Edinburgh, Scotland and a subsidiary of the Scottish Bus Group (formerly SMT Group). Eastern Scottish was formed in June 1985 from the main part of Scottish Omnibuses Ltd., which had itself traded as 'Eastern Scottish' since the 1960s.  Following privatisation in 1990 the company traded as 'SMT' reviving the original name of the company (Scottish Motor Traction). It operated until 1994, when it became part of GRT Bus Group plc.

Operation
From its head office on New Street, Edinburgh, Eastern Scottish had an operating area throughout the Lothians, in the east of Scotland, bounded by the Firth of Forth to the north and east, Fauldhouse in the west, and Gorebridge (Birkenside) in the south.

Eastern operated urban, interurban and rural services in and around Bathgate, Livingston, Dalkeith and Musselburgh, and services within the city of Edinburgh. Depots were also located in these towns.

Eastern was also active in the coaching business, operating day tours and private hires, as well as providing coaches for Scottish Citylink express from Edinburgh to Glasgow, Aberdeen, Inverness, London and many other locations throughout Scotland and England.

History
The Scottish Motor Traction Company Ltd. (trading as "SMT") was formed in 1905, and expanded quickly through a series of takeovers to become the principal bus operator in south east Scotland. By the 1930s SMT was also the parent company of the SMT Group, whose other subsidiaries operated buses elsewhere in Scotland. In 1949 the SMT Group's bus operations were nationalised by transfer to a new British Transport Commission subsidiary, Scottish Omnibuses Ltd., although the SMT name remained in use until the early 1960s in the east, and was retained even longer in the Western SMT and Central SMT operating units of the Scottish Bus Group.  

Subsequently, "Scottish Omnibuses", "Scottish", and then "Eastern Scottish" fleetnames were used.  The SMT name remained in Edinburgh parlance long after the change of fleet name, and survived on an unrelated car dealership showroom on Lothian Road, Edinburgh.

With nationalisation some rationalisation of SMT Group operations took place.  The SMT Company's isolated operations in the Dundee area did not pass to Scottish Omnibuses, but instead passed to sister company W. Alexander & Sons Ltd.

In the Edinburgh area this history resulted in SMT/Eastern Scottish retaining the right to carry passengers within the city boundary (contrast Glasgow where only pickup outward and set-down inward were permitted).  The cessation of tramway operation in Edinburgh (which at one time extended through Musselburgh to Port Seton) was accompanied by service reallocations, making Musselburgh exclusive to SMT/Eastern Scottish, and takeover of Gilmerton services by the corporation buses, albeit with competition from Eastern Scottish's Birkenside and some Rosewell services. 

In 1958 Lowland Motorways of Glasgow was taken over, with various local services in the east side of the city. Another acquisition in the west of Scottish Omnibuses' territory was Baxter's Bus Service of Airdrie in 1962, with local services in the Airdrie and Coatbridge areas.  These purchases significantly increased the company's presence in the Lanarkshire and Glasgow area.  The final significant takeover was that of Stark's Motor Service of Dunbar in 1964.  Stark's had operated some of its services jointly with Scottish Omnibuses for some years, and a proportion of its fleet was already painted in SMT livery.

When the Baxter's business was acquired, adverse public reaction to the repainting of buses into Scottish Omnibuses livery led to a decision to retain the Baxter's identity and blue livery for buses based at Victoria depot and used on town services around Airdrie and Coatbridge. The Stark's livery, a lighter shade of green than that used by Scottish Omnibuses, was retained for buses at Dunbar and North Berwick. Both local identities disappeared in the late 1970s when the SBG's new corporate fleetname style was introduced ("Eastern SCOTTISH", with a saltire logo).

SMT and Scottish Omnibuses had long been a major operator of long-distance coach services, usually in cooperation with English operators such as Grey-Green, Midland Red and Ribble, using the Eastern Scottish fleetname and green/cream livery.  Dual-purpose coaches were prefixed Z and carried a 50/50 green/cream livery, and tour coaches were prefixed Y and carried a majority cream livery.  A marketing feature was the operation of 2 and 3 day tours between London and Edinburgh, available as single or return journeys.  This business was supported by a permanent sales office in London, operated by Eastern Scottish-uniformed staff.  

A unique black/yellow livery on Bristol REMH vehicles serving Edinburgh-London in the 1970s. Western SMT, with fleetname Western Scottish, paralleled this service from Glasgow, using identical vehicles in a black/white livery.  From the mid-1970s Scottish Bus Group policy increasingly saw such services operated with a corporate SBG identity rather than the individual names and liveries of the subsidiary operating companies.  Initially, SBG coaches used on express services to London received a special blue and white livery with "SCOTTISH" branding; in the early 1980s most other express services were branded "Scottish Citylink" with a two-tone blue and yellow livery.

Depots

Depot codes were introduced in the 1930s.  At the time of nationalisation the principal depots were:

A Edinburgh (New Street)
B Bathgate (Whitburn Road)
C (formerly Dundee)
D Galashiels (Duke Street)
E Kelso (Roxburgh Street)
F Linlithgow (High Street)
G Dalkeith (High Street)
H Clarkston Depot, Airdrie (Connor Street)
I Broxburn (East Main Street)
J Berwick-upon-Tweed (Marygate)
K Peebles (Innerleithen Road)
L (formerly Carlisle)
W Musselburgh (Mall Avenue)

In addition to these there were several sub-depots in the Borders area, including Biggar (North Back Street), Hawick (Dovecote Street), Jedburgh (Castle Gate), Melrose (Abbey Street) and Selkirk (Mill Street).  Changes to depots over the years comprised:

1957: Hawick elevated to full depot status (code L)
1960: new Baillieston (Station Road) depot opened (code C), partly to operate services taken over from Lowland Motorways
1962: new engineering works and body shop opened at Marine Gardens (Seafield Road), Edinburgh
1962: Victoria Depot, Airdrie (Gartlea Road) taken over with Baxter's business (code V)
1963: Melrose sub-depot closed
1964: Dunbar (Countess Crescent) depot (code S) and North Berwick (Tantallon Road) sub-depot taken over with Stark's business;
1966: Dalkeith depot replaced by new combined depot/bus station at Eskbank Road (code G)
1971: Selkirk sub-depot closed
1979: Broxburn depot replaced by new combined depot/bus station at Livingston (Almondvale South) (code N)
1979: Airdrie Victoria depot closed

Deregulation

In preparation for deregulation in 1986, and eventual privatisation, the Scottish Bus Group was reorganised in 1985. The Scottish Omnibuses operations from Berwick, Dunbar, Galashiels, Hawick, Jedburgh, Kelso, North Berwick and Peebles depots passed to a new company, Lowland Scottish Omnibuses Ltd., whilst Airdrie (Clarkston) depot was passed to Central Scottish Omnibuses Ltd., Linlithgow depot passed to Midland Scottish Omnibuses Ltd., and Baillieston depot was closed (its vehicles and operations being transferred briefly to the Stepps depot of Midland Scottish, pending further reorganisation to create Kelvin Scottish Omnibuses Ltd.). The licences for express coach services passed to the new Scottish Citylink Coaches Ltd., and Marine Works passed to another new SBG subsidiary company, SBG Engineering Ltd. The remnant of Scottish Omnibuses, comprising the core of the former company's territory in the Lothians area, with the depots at Bathgate, Dalkeith, Edinburgh, Livingston, Musselburgh and the sub-depot at Biggar (which closed in 1986), was renamed Eastern Scottish Omnibuses Ltd. Eastern Scottish retained the traditional green and cream livery for its fleet.

Upon deregulation, Eastern Scottish faced little to no competition outside Edinburgh, despite a highly urbanised operating area. Within Edinburgh, Eastern found itself sparring with the larger, dominant city operator, Lothian Regional Transport (LRT), for a larger share of the city traffic. In late 1986 Eastern introduced nine new routes within Edinburgh, some of which closely mirrored sections of existing LRT routes. These were numbered C1-C9, the minibuses carried the "City Sprinter" fleet branding. At the start of deregulation in October 1986, route C5 ran a 5 minute frequency between Clovenstone and Restalrig via the city centre, operating a hail and ride on some parts of the route. Some routes were operated by a fleet of 70 Dodge minibuses, whilst others used double deck buses, notably 25 secondhand ex-South Yorkshire Transport Volvo Ailsa B55s with Irish-built Van Hool-McArdle bodywork. Some of these routes only lasted for a short period.

LRT retaliated by extending services beyond the city boundary and deeper into Eastern's operating area. Together with the loyalty of the passengers to the familiar "madder" coloured fleet of the "corporation" (as LRT was still sometimes known), LRT's competitive tactics ensured that Eastern made no significant inroads to the city market. Despite competition between the two operators, bitter "bus wars" that broke out in other cities and towns across Scotland were largely avoided, and Eastern did not persevere with loss-making operations, but settled for economy by reducing use of St. Andrew's Bus Station by running through Edinburgh city centre to destinations such as Charlotte Square, Haymarket, Clermiston and Silverknowes, and connecting traditional routes such as ones to Balerno and Wallyford end-to end to create new cross-city links which in some cases competed with those of LRT.

Privatisation

Eastern Scottish was one of the most financially successful subsidiaries of the Scottish Bus Group, with an operating profit of £1.07m in 1989. This was due in large part to initiatives such as the City Sprinter minibus scheme, which had quickly expanded into a considerable network of high-frequency routes. In September 1990 the company was sold to its management and employees for £9.5m, making it the most expensive subsidiary in the sell-off. The company began trading as SMT once again, with a modern, stylised take on the traditional diamond logo. Some investment in new vehicles and the introduction of "quality corridors", branded as 'Diamond Service', followed. Competitive attack on city routes using double-deckers was unsuccessful against the economy of scale available to LRT, lack of route coverage to make season ticket purchases attractive, and customer loyalty.  

In October 1994 the GRT Group, which later became FirstBus (April 1995) then FirstGroup in December 1997, bought the company for £10.3m. In 1996, the company, now trading as First SMT, was broken up and merged into neighbouring FirstGroup subsidiaries Midland Bluebird Ltd (formerly Midland Scottish) and Lowland Omnibuses (formerly Lowland Scottish) which later merged to form First Edinburgh, trading simply as First. Eastern Scottish Omnibuses Ltd ceased trading as an independent concern.

See also
List of bus operators of the United Kingdom

External links
First Central Scotland website
Eastern Scottish Omnibuses Ltd.

Bibliography
 Barker, Harry L., SMT Buses: The Buses of Scottish Omnibuses Ltd and Eastern Scottish (Bus Enthusiast Publishing, 2004).
 Brown, Stewart J., Advancing in a Forward Direction: The Vehicle Purchases of the Scottish Bus Group (Fawndoon Books, 2016).
 Burnett, John, Eastern Scottish (Turntable Publications, 1980).
 Hunter, D. L. G., From SMT to Eastern Scottish: An 80th Anniversary Story (John Donald, 1987). 

Defunct companies of Scotland
Former bus operators in Scotland
Transport in Edinburgh
Transport in West Lothian
Transport in Midlothian
Transport in East Lothian